Vincenzo Grifo (born 7 April 1993) is a professional footballer who plays as a winger or midfielder for Bundesliga club SC Freiburg. Born in Germany, he represents the Italy national team.

Club career

Early career
Grifo began his footballing career with local youth sides 1. CfR Pforzheim and Germania Brötzingen, before joining 2. Bundesliga side Karlsruher SC in 2011.

1899 Hoffenheim
In July 2012, he joined Hoffenheim on a free transfer, signing a two-year contract with the club. After initially playing for the reserve side in the Regionalliga Südwest, he was soon promoted to the Hoffenheim senior squad, and made his debut with the club in the Bundesliga on 19 October 2012, in a 3–2 home win over Greuther Fürth, coming on as a substitute for Takashi Usami. His performances earned him a two-year contract extension, and saw him make a total of 12 substitute appearances throughout the 2012–13 season, as well as 13 appearances and 5 goals in the Regionalliga. In the summer of 2013, he was officially promoted to the first squad, and was given the number 32 shirt. He spent the next seasons on loan with Dynamo Dresden and FSV Frankfurt; with Frankfurt, he registered 7 goals and 10 assists in 35 appearances throughout the 2014–15 season.

SC Freiburg
His performances led SC Freiburg to purchase him for €1.5 million in July 2015; Grifo played a key role in helping the club to win the 2. Bundesliga title and obtain promotion to the Bundesliga, registering 14 goals and 15 assists in 31 league appearances throughout the 2015–16 season.

In the opening six matches of the 2016–17 season, Grifo registered one goal and four assists in the Bundesliga, as well as three goals in two appearances in the DFB-Pokal. He finished the season with 6 goals and 12 assists in 30 league matches.

In his time at Freiburg he scored 20 goals and made 26 assists in 61 league appearances.

Borussia Mönchengladbach
On 28 May 2017, Bundesliga rivals Borussia Mönchengladbach announced the signing of Grifo on a four-year contract for an undisclosed fee, thought to be around €6 million. The transfer went through on 1 July.

Return to 1899 Hoffenheim
On 11 June 2018, Hoffenheim signed Grifo on a four-year deal.

On 6 January 2019, Grifo returned to Freiburg on a loan deal until the end of 2018–19 season.

Return to SC Freiburg
On 2 September 2019, Grifo returned to Freiburg permanently once again, having spent the second half of the 2018–19 season on loan at the club. On 13 November 2022, he scored his first Bundesliga hat-trick in the first 20 minutes in a 4–1 win over Union Berlin.

International career
On 6 September 2013, Grifo earned his first cap for the Italian under-20 team under manager Alberigo Evani, scoring a goal in a 3–3 draw against Switzerland in Lugano. On 14 October 2013, Grifo earned his first call-up to the Italy under-21 side from manager Luigi Di Biagio for Italy's Euro 2015 qualifying match against Belgium.

On 20 November 2018, Grifo made his senior debut for Italy, managed by Roberto Mancini, as a second half substitute during a 1–0 friendly win against the United States in Genk.

On 15 October 2019, Grifo made his first start for Italy in a 5–0 away win against Liechtenstein during a UEFA Euro 2020 qualifying match.

On 11 November 2020, Grifo scored his first goals for Italy, the first in the first half, and the second in the second half via a penalty shot, in a 4–0 home win against Estonia during a friendly. On 16 November 2022, he scored another brace in a friendly match against Albania.

Style of play
An intelligent and creative midfielder, with good offensive capabilities and an eye for goal, Grifo usually plays as a winger on the left flank, despite being naturally right-footed, a position which allows him to cut into the middle and shoot on goal, due to his finishing ability as well as his striking accuracy from distance; a versatile playmaker, he is also capable of playing as an attacking midfielder, as well as in several other attacking positions, and has frequently been deployed as an outside forward. Considered to be a talented and promising young player, he is mainly known for his technique, flair, and dribbling skills, while his vision, range of passing, set-piece delivery, and crossing accuracy make him an excellent assist provider. A dead-ball specialist, he is also an accurate free kick and penalty kick taker.

Personal life
Grifo was born in Pforzheim, Germany, to Italian parents; his mother is from Apulia, while his father is from Naro, in the province of Agrigento, Sicily.

Career statistics

Club

International

Scores and results list Italy's goal tally first, score column indicates score after each Grifo goal.

Honours
SC Freiburg
 2. Bundesliga: 2015–16
 DFB-Pokal: runner-Up 2021–22

Individual
 2. Bundesliga top assist provider: 2015–16 (11 assists)

References

External links
 
 Profile at FIGC.it 

Living people
1993 births
German footballers
Italian footballers
Citizens of Italy through descent
German people of Italian descent
German people of Sicilian descent
Association football midfielders
Italy international footballers
Italy youth international footballers
TSG 1899 Hoffenheim players
Dynamo Dresden players
FSV Frankfurt players
SC Freiburg players
Borussia Mönchengladbach players
Bundesliga players
2. Bundesliga players
Sportspeople from Pforzheim
Footballers from Baden-Württemberg